William Fitzsimmons may refer to:

William Fitzsimmons (Canadian politician) (1818–1894)
William Fitzsimmons (Northern Ireland politician) (1909–1992), in Northern Ireland
William Fitzsimmons (musician) (born 1978), American singer-songwriter

See also
William FitzSimons (1870–1926), Irish-born Australian politician
William T. Fitzsimons (1889—1917), a U.S. Army officer